The Botswana women's national volleyball team represents Botswana in international competitions in women's volleyball.

Results

African Championship
 2003 – did not participate
 2005 – 7th place
 2007 – 7th place
 2009 – 5th place
 2011 – 7th place
 2013 – did not participate
 2015 – 7th place

All-Africa Games 
 2007 – did not participate
 2011 – 6th place
 2015 – group stage

References 

Volleyball
National women's volleyball teams
Volleyball in Botswana